Kovalenko is a very common Ukrainian surname.

It is used commonly to describe a son of a blacksmith and is the equivalent of Smithson in the English-speaking world, derived from the root koval (meaning literally "blacksmith"). It can refer to:

 Aleksandr Kovalenko (Alexandr, Alexander)
 Aleksandr Kovalenko (born 1963), retired USSR triple jumper
 Alexander Andreevich Kovalenko (1909–1984), Soviet WWII pilot, hero of the Soviet Union
 Alexandr Covalenco (born 1978), Moldovan footballer
 Oleksandr Kovalenko (disambiguation), several people
 Alevtina Kovalenko (born 1980), Russian bobsledder
 Anastassia Kovalenko (born 1991), Estonian motorcycle road racer
 Andrei Kovalenko
 Andrei Kovalenko (born 1970), Russian ice hockey player
 Andriy Kovalenko (born 1970), Australian water polo player
 Bohdan Kovalenko (born 1997), Ukrainian footballer
 Dema Kovalenko (born 1977), Ukrainian footballer
 Igor Kovalenko (born 1988), Ukrainian chess grandmaster now playing for Latvia
 Irina Kovalenko (born 1984), Russian model
 Iryna Kovalenko (born 1986), Ukrainian high jumper
 Kostiantyn Kovalenko (born 1986), Ukrainian footballer
 Lyudmyla Kovalenko, Ukrainian writer
 Lyudmyla Kovalenko (b. 1989), Ukrainian athlete
 Oleksandr Kovalenko (footballer) (1976 – 2010), Ukrainian footballer
 Oleg Kovalenko (born 1988), Ukrainian footballer
 Sergei Kovalenko
 Sergei Kovalenko (born 1947), former Soviet basketball player
 Serhiy Kovalenko (born 1984), Ukrainian footballer
 Viktor Kovalenko (disambiguation), several people
 Vitali Kovalenko
 Vitali Kovalenko (born 1934), Russian volleyball player
 Vitali Kovalenko (1947–2014), Russian chess composer
 Vyacheslav Kovalenko (born 1946), Russian diplomat
 Yevhen Kovalenko (born 1992), Ukrainian footballer
 Yuriy Kovalenko (1977-2014), Ukrainian soldier and Hero of Ukraine recipient

See also
 
Koval (surname)
Kovalyov, a surname
Kovachenko, a surname

Ukrainian-language surnames
Occupational surnames
Surnames of Ukrainian origin